Zoogin (3 June 1990 – 10 June 2020) was a Swedish racing trotter by Zoot Suit out of Ginjette by Lornjett.

His most prestigious victories include the Swedish Trotting Criterium (Swedish: Svenskt Travkriterium) (1993), Oslo Grand Prix (1997), Finlandia-Ajo (1997) and Copenhagen Cup (1997). At the end of his career, the stallion had earned US$2,989,271 (€2,914,376). He won the Horse of the Year Award in Sweden for 1996.

Pedigree

References

1990 racehorse births
2020 racehorse deaths
Swedish standardbred racehorses